Point is an unincorporated community in Lauderdale County, Mississippi, United States. Its ZIP code is 39323.

History 
Initially established sometime prior to 1891 as a flagstop and freight station on the Illinois Central Railroad, the community was known as Lacey until September 1895, when a post office was established at the place by Samuel H. Wilson. The community had a depot, water tank, post office, house track, school, and a siding track.  The population was 27 in 1900.  The post office was abolished in March of 1907.

Notes 

Unincorporated communities in Lauderdale County, Mississippi
Unincorporated communities in Mississippi